Hounslow Priory was a priory in London, England. It was first recorded existing in the year 1200.

References

Monasteries in London